Uppi 2 (titled Upendra 2 in Telugu) is a 2015 Indian Kannada-language psychological thriller film written, directed and starring Upendra in the lead role, and is a sequel to his 1999 film Upendra, and was produced under his production company, Upendra Productions. Alongside Upendra, the film stars Kristina Akheeva and Parul Yadav in lead roles. The supporting cast features Sayaji Shinde, Shobhraj, Satyajit, Bank Janardhan and Mimicry Dayanand. The soundtrack and film score were composed by Gurukiran. The dubbed Telugu version titled Upendra 2, was released the same day.

Although the film got mixed response because of its confusing story-line and screenplay, it was highly profitable at the box office and completed 50 days of run. Upendra won the South Indian International Movie Award for Best Director for the film.

While, the movie Upendra was all about "Naanu" (I), Uppi 2 is about "Neenu" (You). The name also is synonym to the dish Uppittu. While the movie Upendra had a song titled "Uppiginta ruchi bere illa" which means nothing tastes better than salt, it also has another meaning that "Uppi" is better than others (Upendra is addressed as Uppi). In Uppi 2, a song titled Uppittu is part of the movie.

Plot
Neenu, which translates to 'You' (Upendra), is a happy and content person who never thinks about the future and is undisturbed by the past. He hardly earns anything despite his toil since he never takes money from anyone for his services, often menial jobs, asked to him to be done by the people of his locality and the crew of the film production unit. Lakshmi (Kristina Akheeva), a psychology student takes interest in him after she learns about Naanu, which translates to 'I', (played by Upendra in the prequel Upendra, who eventually becomes Neenu in Uppi 2) from her professor. Her constant pursuit of him eventually leads to his discovery. Moved by his happy, unblemished and selfless personality, she eventually falls in love with him. Yet she fails to take him out of his strange world of selflessness.

Meanwhile, Saleem (Shobhraj), an underworld don based in Dubai, aided by his trusted aide Malpe Bala and his henchmen, has been in constant quest of finding Neenu, regarding a property worth hundreds of crores belonging to a widow, Mandakini, who has become a follower of an aghori,  Neenu (before posing as the humble Neenu). The aghori is also being shown exploiting Sheela (Parul Yadav) who comes seeking spiritual advice after being dejected in love.

Simultaneously, Neenu is seen being chased by top cop Sayaji Shinde who tries to find him and embezzle the property. Unknown about this, sleuths of the Crime Investigation Department (India) interpret Neenu as an undercover agent trying to nab the most wanted fugitive don, Saleem.
 
Neenu finally manages to subdue his chasers by instigating the cops against the goons and grips with Lakshmi. It becomes apparent that Mandakini is a fictional character imagined by the cops and Neenu is just a normal man. The will made by Mandakini of her property gives a philosophical view that when one stops saying Naanu or I, which symbolizes fear, anger, jealousy and selfishness; holds to Neenu or You, which symbolizes gratitude, kindness, selflessness; and when one stops thinking about the past and the future, will happiness (khushi), the 'daughter' of Mandakini (calmness in the heart) would stay with him forever.

Cast 

 Upendra as Naanu / Neenu
 Kristina Akheeva as Lakshmi / Khushi
 Parul Yadav as Sheela (extended cameo)
 Sayaji Shinde
 Satyajit
 Shobhraj as Saleem
 R. N. Sudarshan as a legislator
 Nagaraj Murthy
 Tennis Krishna as HuLa
 Mimicry Dayanand as Swami Akhilanda
 Tanishka kapoor as Lakshmi's friend
 Sanjay Aryan
 Vinayak Trivedi
 Chethan
 Tumkur Mohan
 Bank Janardhan
 Vaijanath Biradar as Constable Rajguru
 Saroja Srishailan
 Suvarna Shetty
 Urmila
 Shruthi
 Sri (Crazy Mindz)
 Manjaiah
 Manjunatha Rao in a cameo appearance (uncredited)

Production

Development
Following the massive success of his 1999 film Upendra, Upendra had always wanted to make a sequel to it. Having written the story sometime in the early 2000s, it was ready by 2004. In January 2012, Upendra announced that he is working on the script for the sequel titled Upendra 2. The first posters of Upendra 2 were released on the Internet on 16 September 2012. The posters featured a huge rectangle, with no clear name inside it, but with a heap of mathematical formulae – be it arithmetic, algebra, geometry, analytical geometry, calculus and so on – and had a byline – "directed by Upendra". The title of the film was changed to Uppi 2 after he saw it painted on the back of an auto rickshaw. Uppi 2 was launched by Upendra on 18 September 2013 at Kanteerava Studios in Bangalore, amongst thousands of fans gathered to witness the launch. Lathi Charge from the police to control the crowd of fans gathered at the venue was reported.

Casting
As the makers were on the lookout for the female lead for the film, the names of Bollywood actresses Aishwarya Rai Bachchan and Vidya Balan made rounds. Eventually, a Russian model-turned-actress Kristina Akheeva landed the role.

Marketing
Right from the time Upendra announced of making the film, posters made by fans began circulating on social media platforms, most of which featured Upendra in costume from his eponymous prequel to Uppi 2. The official first look poster was revealed on 1 November 2014. This was followed by numerous fan-made posters released by Upendra on his Facebook page, which were in turn circulated and received widespread popularity leading up to the film's release. The first teaser trailer of the film was released on 18 September 2014, marking Upendra's 47th birthday. Alongside, fan-made Dubsmash videos and teasers were circulated and shared by the official Facebook and Twitter handles of the film. The first look poster of the film's Telugu version was released in August 2015. Upendra launched an official app of the film and other merchandise including T-shirts featuring the film's title logo, a week prior to its release. The second teaser trailer was released on 10 August 2015. It featured Upendra doing a yoga posture, sirsasana, in the Himalayan region, and sporting the look of an aghori. The cutout poster of this was unveiled by him at a theatre in Bangalore.

Soundtrack 

Gurukiran, who scored for the prequel Upendra, scored for the background and soundtrack Uppi 2 as well. Lyrics for the soundtrack were penned by Upendra. It marked the reunion of the composer with Upendra after 16 years. Times Music bought the music rights of the film and was produced under their label Junglee Music. The soundtrack album consists of six tracks. It was released on 17 July 2015 at Ruppis Resort, a resort in Bangalore. Simultaneously, it was released by fan clubs of Upendra in around 15 districts across Karnataka.

The Telugu version of the album was released on 9 August 2015 in Hyderabad.

Track listing 

Ytalkies.com reviewed the album and gave it a mixed review it considering that "Uppi [Upendra] and Gurukiran combo" were coming together after long time and fans having had to wait two years for the album. The reviewer called the track "Baekoo Baekoo Anno" and wrote, "the peppy beats and deep-thinking lyrics are very entertaining." Of the track "Excuse Me Please", he wrote, "This is more of a ‘different style dialogue narration’ song; Uppi takes over the song with some entertaining lyrics, where he explains that time is everything..." He concluded calling it "[a] very average album".

Controversies 
Ever since filming began in 2014, Upendra had been accused of plagiarism of the film's story, after similar accusations that followed after his previous directorial decided to take legal action against the accuser. Responding to the controversy, he wrote on his Facebook page, "Deeply disturbed with all these questions about the Uppi 2 script... There is no way we will tolerate any false allegations about the script."

A day after  the release of the film's soundtrack album, on 17 July 2015, another controversy came about over the lyrics of the song "No Excuse Me Please", penned and sung by Upendra himself. It features lyrics sung in a conversation tone in the form of a monologue with rhythm, and was reported that it takes a dig at other actors including Shiva Rajkumar and Yash. The media reported the story over Upendra crediting himself over introducing machete-wielding lead actors in Kannada cinema, through Shiva Rajkumar, in his directorial Om (1995).

Release
The film was given the "U/A" (Parental Guidance) certificate by the Regional Censor Board. The Board asked the makers for a "violent visual" and two dialogues to be cut, and muting a couple of other dialogues, adding up to a total of five cuts. It released theatrically on 14 August 2015, on the eve of Indian Independence Day, in over 200 screens in Karnataka, and 400 screens in Telugu in Andhra Pradesh and Telangana, adding up to over 685 screens. The Telugu dubbing rights was acquired by film producer Nallamalupu Bujji and the rights for distribution in Andhra Pradesh and Telangana were bought by RS Films for 1.08 crore. It was reported that the distribution rights for Karnataka were acquired by Srikanth of Shankar Enterprises for a sum of 100 million. Uppi 2 was also released in the US, Australia among other countries.

Reception
Upon theatrical release, the film opened to positive response from the audience who, however, spoke of its "confusing screenplay", and positive to mixed reviews from film critics. The critics acclaimed the theme of the film and Upendra's acting performance, and criticized the soundtrack and the film's "abrupt ending".

Reviewing the film for The Hindu, Archana Nathan called the film a "self-help book" where "Upendra wonders... about the concept of you (neenu) "unearth[ing] theories about the different kinds of people on this planet, their manner of thinking..." and handing down "some life advice." She further wrote, "Upendra theorises about three different kinds of people: those who obsess about the future, those who live in the past and finally, those who live entirely in the present. It is the third kind that he champions and practises in the film." She concluded writing, "Uppi2 wants to reform you but overdoes it." S. Viswanath of Deccan Herald wrote, "... Upendra takes on a highly philosophical pitch while narrating a convoluted, but cracker of an action plot." He called the film Upendra's "show all the away" and added that "he goes on philosophising about the real and unreal, seen and unseen, the here and now." He concluded writing, "[the film] climaxes to an unpredictable end, you are in a tizzy, swirled and squished by the storytelling." Shyam Prasad S. of Bangalore Mirror felt that "[t]he execution of the film does not match the brilliance of the script." He drew comparisons of the protagonist's role and philosophy of life to Eckhart Tolle's work The Power of Now and called the lead character a pale shadow of his trademark eccentric characters in A and Upendra which behaved like Jean-Paul Sartre's Erostratus. Crediting the technical and acting departments with mixed reviews, he concluded writing, "Uppi2 stands apart, but just about."

A. Sharadhaa of The New Indian Express felt the film was "[H]igh on intrinsic value" and wrote, "It may be an ambitious attempt to teach life lessons to the common man, but that is exactly the reason why Uppi 2 could fall into the category of films which were bold enough to go beyond the obvious. And surely, even with its little puzzles, the film does not disappoint." She further wrote, "As an actor too, he [Upendra] portrays the various shades of life with élan. His different avatars all send a message.  Kristina Akheeva has tried her best to live up to expectations while Parul Yadav’s short and sweet role has a good impact." She concluded praising the acting performances of supporting characters, music and the cinematography. Writing for The Times of India, Sunayana Suresh felt that it "preach[es] his [Upendra's] brand of pop philosophy, which has far evolved from the one he preached in the decade-old film Upendra". She wrote, "Parul Yadav's cameo is one of the highlights of the film. Upendra is at his vintage best when it comes to acting." She felt that Kristina Akheeva's casting was "debatable" noting that "she doesn't seem to add much weight to the film" with her lip sync also going "awry".

Box office

Domestic 
Uppi 2 opened very strongly in theatres and registered a 100% occupancy in most theatres across Karnataka and from screening in the United States. Many theaters scheduled the first show on Friday as early as 6 AM. Advanced bookings which were opened online two days earlier on Wednesday got a huge response. Most of the shows at single screens and multiplexes in Bengaluru were sold out soon. It collected 3.25 crore on its first day from Karnataka alone setting up records for the highest first day for a Kannada movie. The business saw a growth on Saturday due to Independence Day. As a result, the film earned 3.60 crore on the second day taking the two-day total business of the film to 6.85 crore. The film collected a total of 10 crore in its first weekend. It reportedly collected more than 15 crore in 3 weeks from release in Karnataka. The film completed 50 days run in theaters. It collected 80 lakh share in Andhra Pradesh and Telangana. According to Bookmyshow website's Best of 2015 survey, Uppi 2 sold the second highest number of tickets on Bookmyshow among Kannada movies in 2015 behind RangiTaranga and ahead of other box-office hits like Mr. and Mrs. Ramachari, Ranna and Rana Vikrama.

Overseas 
Upon release in the US in 21 screens, it collected US$31,981 (21.26 lakh) in its first weekend. On course of a successful run in the US, it was further released in over 20 screens and Upendra was invited there in September 2015 to promote the film. After its 8th weekend in the US, the film had collected a total of US$47,347 (30.88 lakh). Uppi 2 is the second highest grossing Kannada film in US behind RangiTaranga (which grossed 2.1 crore) and ahead of the third highest grosser Mr. and Mrs. Ramachari (which grossed 8 lakh in US). It also opened to houseful screenings in Australia (Perth, Melbourne, Sydney), Germany and Singapore.

Awards

See also 
 List of Kannada films of 2015

References

External links 
 
 

2015 films
2010s Kannada-language films
2015 psychological thriller films
Films scored by Gurukiran
Indian psychological thriller films
Films directed by Upendra
Indian sequel films